David Edgar Games (born 1938) was a Welsh chemist best known for his work in mass spectrometry and chromatography.

Early life and education 
Dai grew up in Ynysddu in South Wales and attended the Lewis School, Pengam.

Career and research 
Dai graduated from King's College London, where he also obtained his PhD. After postdoctoral work at McMaster University, Hamilton, he moved to University of Wales Cardiff, where he progressed to a personal chair.  In 1989 he moved to Swansea as Head of the Mass Spectrometry Research Unit at University of Wales, Swansea. Although best known as a mass spectrometrist and separation scientist who was the first person to bring liquid chromatography-mass spectrometry to Europe, he has made considerable contributions in organic chemistry research and served as Head of the Chemistry Department at Swansea.

Awards and honours 
In 1987, he was awarded the Royal Society of Chemistry medal for Analytical Separations and in 1991, was awarded the Martin Medal by the Chromatographic Society. In 1993 he received the Gold Medal of the Society of Analytical Chemistry. The International Mass Spectrometry Society awarded him the J.J.Thomson Medal in 1997, and in 1999 he received the A.J.Evans Medal from Cardiff University.

He was a past Chairman of the BMSS, served on the SERC Chemistry Committee as Chairman of the Instrumentation Panel and also on NERC, MRC and AFRC panels. He was a former Joint Editor-in-Chief of Biomedical and Environmental Mass Spectrometry.

References 

1938 births
2018 deaths
Welsh chemists
Mass spectrometrists
Alumni of King's College London